Runar Robinsønn Norheim (born 14 February 2005) is a Norwegian footballer who plays as a midfielder for Tromsø.

Club career
Norheim joined Tromsø in 2020, and was integrated into the first team, making his debut the same year. In doing so, he became the youngest Tromsø player ever. In May 2022, he scored a hat-trick in an 8–0 Norwegian Cup win against Ishavsbyen.

He signed a contract extension with Tromsø in September 2022, running through to 2024. In the same month, he was named by English newspaper The Guardian as one of the best players born in 2005 worldwide.

Career statistics

Club

Notes

References

2005 births
Living people
People from Lenvik
Norwegian footballers
Norway youth international footballers
Association football midfielders
Tromsø IL players
Norwegian First Division players
Eliteserien players
Norwegian Third Division players